The Mixed team normal hill/2 × 2.5 km/2 × 5 km competition at the FIS Nordic World Ski Championships 2023 was held on 26 February 2023.

Results

Ski jumping
The ski jumping part was started at 12:42.

Cross-country skiing
The cross-country skiing part was started at 15:00.

References

Mixed team normal hill/2 × 2.5 km/2 × 5 km